Giuseppe Citterio (born 27 March 1967) is an Italian former racing cyclist. He competed as a professional from 1990 to 1996. He competed in two editions of the Tour de France, four of the Giro d'Italia as well as the 1996 Vuelta a España. He most notably won a stage of the 1995 Giro d'Italia as well as the Classic Haribo the same year.

Major results
1990
 2nd Milano–Vignola
 10th Giro dell'Etna
1991
 2nd Giro dell'Etna
1992
 1st Stage 3b Hofbrau Cup
1993
 3rd Scheldeprijs
1995
 1st Classic Haribo
 1st Stage 16 Giro d'Italia
1996
 1st Stage 3 Volta a la Comunitat Valenciana
 9th Paris–Tours

Grand Tour general classification results timeline

References

External links 
Giuseppe Citterio at The Sports.org

1967 births
Living people
People from Seregno
Italian male cyclists
Cyclists from the Province of Monza e Brianza